Diogo Henrique Gomes Neto (born 11 November 1999) is a Portuguese professional footballer who plays for S.C. Covilhã as a midfielder.

Football career
On 4 november 2018, Neto made his professional debut with Sporting Covilhã in a 2018–19 LigaPro match against Oliveirense.

References

External links

1999 births
Living people
Sportspeople from Cascais
Portuguese footballers
Association football midfielders
Liga Portugal 2 players
S.C. Covilhã players